The Last Ship may refer to:

 The Last Ship (album), 2013 album by Sting
 The Last Ship (musical), 2014 musical
 The Last Ship (novel), 1988 novel by William Brinkley
 The Last Ship (TV series), 2014–2018 television series loosely based on the novel
 The Last Ship, a ship mentioned in J. R. R. Tolkien's The Lord of the Rings (first published 1955); and The Last Ship, a poem by Tolkien appearing in his The Adventures of Tom Bombadil (first published 1961)